Talgarreg is a small village in the county of Ceredigion, Wales.

Culture, history & amenities 
Economically it is sustained by farming, though there are also some small quarries in the area.  The language of the village is still largely Welsh.

The village is the residence of poets Gillian Clarke and Donald Evans, as well as being the former home of the politician Cynog Dafis. The primary school is twinned with Skol Diwan, Guingamp in Brittany. It also has a Pub, Glan-yr-Afon Arms, situated at the end of the village.

External links
www.geograph.co.uk : photos of Talgarreg and surrounding area

Villages in Ceredigion